Samaa TV is a Pakistani Urdu language news channel owned by Aleem Khan. It is the fourth-largest news channel in Pakistan with a market share of 7 percent.

The word 'Samaa' ("سما") is Urdu for 'sky' or 'heaven'. It is broadcast simultaneously from five major cities of Pakistan – Karachi, Lahore, Islamabad, Quetta and Peshawar.

History
Samaa TV was founded in 2007 by Jaag Broadcasting Systems (Pvt) Limited.

In 2020, former provincial minister, Aleem Khan, acquired Samaa TV from Jaag Broadcasting Systems through his subsidiary real estate company, Park View Limited. 

Samaa TV claims that it resists sensationalism in news presentation to the public and focuses on presenting news based on facts. Its company slogan is 'Sansani Nahin, Sirf Khabrain' (No Sensationalism, Only News). 

In 2022, Samaa TV producer Athar Mateen was killed during a robbery in North Nazimabad Karachi.

Channels

Samaa Network Operates the Following Channels:

Samaa News Pakistan - HD – 24-Hour Urdu News Channel (Launched in 
8 December 2007)

Samaa News UAE - HD – 24-Hour Urdu News Channel (Launched in May 30, 2022)

Samaa News UK - HD – 24-Hour Urdu News Channel (Launched in Aug 21, 2022)
Samaa News USA - HD - 24-Hour Urdu News Channel (Launched in Feb 2 2023)
Samaa News Australia - HD 24-Hour Urdu News Channel (Launched in Feb 1 2023)

Upcoming channels

Samaa Entertainment - HD – 24-Hour Entertainment Channel

Samaa Sports - HD – 24-Hour Sports Channel

Programming 
Nadeem Malik Live
Red Line With Syed Talat Hussain
Naya Din
Do Tok With Kiran Naz
Super Over with Ahmed Ali ButtGame Set Match with Sawera Pasha & Adeel AzharMeray Sawaal with Mansoor Ali KhanQutb OnlinePukaar with Muhammad Zohaib Saleem Butt
Black and White with Hassan Nisar
Straight Talk with Ayesha Bakhsh

See also
List of Television Stations in Pakistan
List of news channels in Pakistan

References

External links
SAMAA TV - official website

Urdu-language television channels
Television networks in Pakistan
24-hour television news channels in Pakistan
Television channels and stations established in 2007
Television stations in Karachi
Mass media in Pakistan
Television stations in Pakistan